Azizullah Fazli (عزیزالله فضلي) is a former Afghan cricketer. He served a term from September 2018 until July 2019 and was reappointed on 22 August 2021 and served until 6 November 2021. Fazli was one of the first Afghan cricket players.

References

Year of birth missing (living people)
Living people
Afghanistan Cricket Board Chairmen